Hechtia lanata is a species of plant in the genus Hechtia. This species is endemic to Mexico.

References

lanata
Flora of Mexico